Andrew Handyside may refer to:

Andrew Handyside and Company,  iron founder in Derby, England; founded by Andrew Handyside (1805–1887)
Andrew Dods Handyside (1835–1904), politician in South Australia